The Workers' Revolutionary Party (PRT) was a Trotskyist political party in Mexico. It was originally founded in 1976 by the merger of two Trotskyist groups: the International Communist League, associated with the United Secretariat of the Fourth International and the Mexican Morenists.

In 1977, the Marxist Workers' League, associated with the Organising Committee for the Reconstruction of the Fourth International, joined the party.  In the following years, other small groups of Trotskyists also joined the PRT, but the group associated with Moreno left in 1979 to form the Socialist Workers' Party. (Partido Obrero Socialista) (POS)

From their base in the 1968 student movement, the PRT grew quickly, soon gaining bases of support among some telephone, electrical, nuclear, and hospital workers. By the 1980s, it was the largest far-left party to challenge the ruling Institutional Revolutionary Party (PRI). In 1981, the federal government recognized the PRT as an official nationwide party. In the 1982 general elections, it was also the first Mexican party to raise gay rights as a campaign issue; the party fielded several openly gay candidates for the Chamber of Deputies. It also entered informal alliances with the other main party on the far left, the United Socialist Party of Mexico (PSUM).

During the latter half of the 1980s, the PRT began to face a series of crises and in-fighting as its progress slowed. It has been alleged that the ruling PRI sent agents into the PRT to disrupt its activities. During the 1988 presidential election, the PRT lost ground as an electoral party because of the campaign of leftist Cuauhtémoc Cárdenas, who soon formed the Democratic Revolutionary Party (PRD).

In 1996, after losing federal recognition, what remained of the PRT (led by Edgard Sánchez Ramírez) formed Socialist Convergence.

Further reading
 Robert J. Alexander, International Trotskyism, 1929-1985: A Documented Analysis of the Movement (Durham: Duke University Press, 1991), 607-618. 

Defunct political parties in Mexico
Fourth International (post-reunification)
Trotskyist organizations in Mexico
Political parties established in 1976